Brooke O'Harra is a director, playwright, performer, and (with composer Brendan Connelly) co-founder of the Obie Award winning Theater of a Two-headed Calf.

Appearances on Reality Television 

 A Dating Story, Episode 110: Jason, Brooke and Ross

References

Living people
21st-century American dramatists and playwrights
Year of birth missing (living people)
Place of birth missing (living people)
Obie Award recipients